Don Si Non station is a railway station located in Nong Tin Nok Subdistrict, Ban Pho District, Chachoengsao Province.

References 

Railway stations in Thailand
Chachoengsao province